Schizocoely (adjective forms: schizocoelous or schizocoelic) is a process by which some animal embryos develop. The schizocoely mechanism occurs when secondary body cavities (coeloms) are formed by splitting a solid mass of mesodermal embryonic tissue. All schizocoelomates are protostomians and they show holoblastic, spiral, determinate cleavage.

Etymology 
This refers to the fact that fluid-filled body cavities are formed by splitting of mesodermal cells.

Taxonomic distribution 
Animals called protostomes develop through schizocoely for which they are also known as schizocoelomates.

Schizocoelous development often occurs in protostomes, as in phyla Mollusca, Annelida, and Arthropoda. Deuterostomes usually exhibit enterocoely; however, some deuterostomes like enteropneusts can exhibit schizocoely as well.

Embryonic development 
The term refers to the order of organization of cells in the gastrula leading to development of the coelom. In mollusks, annelids, and arthropods, the mesoderm (the middle germ layer) forms as a solid mass of migrated cells from the single layer of the gastrula. The new mesoderm then splits, creating the pocket-like cavity of the coelom.

See also 
 Deuterostome
 Development of the digestive system
 Developmental biology
 Embryology
 Embryonic development
 Ontogeny
 Protostome

References

External links 
 Enterocoelous and schizocoelous conditions - UTM.edu 

Developmental biology
Embryology